Mosie Burton was a former Australian professional soccer player who played as a forward for Bundamba and the Australia national soccer team.

International career
Burton played his first and only match for Australia in a 2–1 win over New Zealand in June 1923. This was to be Australia's first win in an international match.

Career statistics

International

References

Australian soccer players
Association football forwards
Australia international soccer players

Year of birth missing
Year of death missing